Canada Mortgage and Housing Corporation (CMHC) (SCHL) is Canada's national housing agency, and state-owned mortgage insurer. It was originally established after World War II, to help returning war veterans find housing, and is a wholly-owned Crown Corporation of the Government of Canada.   Since then, it has seen its mandate expand to the mandate of improving access to housing, including owned and rental.

About 
The CMHC operates with a primary mandate of providing mortgage liquidity, assist in establishing affordable housing development, and provide arms-length advice to the Government of Canada, and housing industry.

Despite the claim of independence, the Crown Corp acts as Canada's national housing agency. As such, it administers Federal housing programs such as the First-time home buyer loan, acts as a mortgage insurer (primarily for high-leverage loans), and provides housing research.

The agency's governance is led by an independent board of directors to ensure independence. However, the board is appointed by the Government of Canada and the agency is directly accountable to Parliament through the Minister of Families, Children and Social Development, clouding the claim. 

History

On 1 January 1946, the agency was founded as the Central Mortgage and Housing Corporation. Its purpose was to find and create housing for veterans returning from World War II, as well as their families

CMHC's basic functions were to administer the National Housing Act and the Home Improvement Loans Guarantee Act and provide discounting facilities for loan and mortgage companies. The capital of the corporation was set at $25 million (a substantial amount for the times), and a reserve fund of $5 million authorized to be accumulated from profits. This requirement and capital structure are still in effect today.

Toward the end of the 1940s, the Government of Canada embarked on a program of much-needed social and rental housing, creating a federal-provincial public housing program for low-income families, with costs and subsidies shared 75% by the federal government and 25% by the province.

In 1947, CMHC took over the assets of Wartime Housing Ltd., another federal Crown corporation that had built thousands of rental housing units for war workers and veterans during the 6 years it was in operation.

During the war, Ajax, Ontario, was constructed and operated by Wartime Housing Limited (1941 to 1949) in order to provide much-needed housing for munitions workers and returning veterans. In 1948, CMHC was given responsibility for Ajax. Its biggest challenges in establishing Ajax as a functioning municipality were reimbursing Pickering Township and Ontario County for municipal services provided to Ajax and establishing an official plan for the growing community acceptable to relevant government agencies. After considerable controversy regarding land and water control, CMHC submitted a successful application to the Ontario Municipal Board in May 1950 making Ajax an improvement district. This was the first step toward municipal status.

In the 1950s, the federal government, through CMHC, provided grants to cities to encourage them to tear down derelict buildings and build municipally owned housing corporations. Regent Park in Toronto is the first urban renewal project, where 42 acres (17 ha) were cleared to build the 1056-unit, low-rent housing development in 1950. Habitations Jeanne-Mance in Montreal is another example. For further examples, see List of public housing projects in Canada.

In 1951, CMHC started implementing the first of many federal-provincial public housing projects with 140 subsidized rent-to-income units in St. John's, Newfoundland.

In 1954, the federal government expanded the National Housing Act to allow chartered banks to enter the NHA lending field. CMHC introduced mortgage loan insurance, taking on mortgage risks with a 25% down payment, making home ownership more accessible to Canadians.

The banks thereafter began to issue mortgage loans with CMHC underwriting. If the individual receiving the loan went bankrupt then the bank who gave the loan would not lose money, but instead would be reimbursed by the government. As part of CMHC lending and insurance mechanisms, low-risk borrowers would have to pay insurance premiums if they wanted to borrow with small down payments.

During the 1960s, CMHC built the first co-operative housing and, for the first time in Canadian history, multi-unit apartment buildings were beginning to outpace housing starts for single-family homes.

Through ongoing research with the building industry, CMHC raised Canadian housing standards to be among the best in the world. The construction of Habitat, designed by architect Moshe Safdie for Expo 67, in Montréal led to many advances in materials and construction.

In 1967, CMHC published Canadian Wood Frame House Construction which became an on-site resource for small builders and trades. Preservation of historic neighbourhoods and downtown living became a priority and, in 1973, CMHC oversaw the transformation of Vancouver's Granville Island, a run-down industrial area, into a thriving centre for culture, recreation and tourism.

In 1974, CMHC introduced the Residential Rehabilitation Assistance Program (RRAP) to repair substandard homes to a minimum level of health and safety and to improve the accessibility of housing for disabled persons.

During that decade, CMHC also turned its attention to Aboriginal and rural housing, introducing the Winter Warmth Assistance Program in 1971, the first of its kind to provide funds to Aboriginals for urgent repairs to housing in rural areas.

In the 1980s, the federal government withdrew from the financing of public housing projects. CMHC no longer directed funds to municipalities for the building of housing projects. Some government housing funds and mortgage guarantees since then have been provided for individual projects.

The 1990s introduced a new era of science and technology, including the development of FlexHousing™, barrier-free housing, and Healthy Housing™, a concept of energy efficiency and resource conservation in home construction.

However, despite these advances, affordability remained a concern, particularly in the early 1990s as a result of the ongoing recession, layoffs and socio-economic uncertainty.

CMHC created the Canadian Centre for Public-Private Partnerships in Housing in 1991, aimed at fostering public/private cooperation in housing projects.

In 1996, CMHC introduced "emili", an automated insurance underwriting system that moves application approval times from days to seconds—making it easier for Canadian homebuyers to obtain mortgage loan insurance.

In 1999, the National Housing Act and the Canada Mortgage and Housing Corporation Act were modified, allowing for the introduction of a 5% down payment—a change launched as a pilot in 1992, extended and finalized in 1999—removing a significant barrier for first-time home buyers. CMHC also expanded its activities internationally and launched the Canadian Housing Export Centre (later renamed CMHC International) to share Canada's housing expertise with the world.

Housing affordability received a boost in 2001 through CMHC's introduction of Canada Mortgage Bonds, aimed at ensuring the supply of low-cost mortgage funding and keeping interest low.

In 2002, CMHC was recognized for its innovative work, receiving the Conference Board of Canada's National Award in Governance in the Public Sector, presented to boards of directors that have demonstrated excellence in governance and have implemented successful innovations in their governance practices.

Homelessness, assisted housing and Aboriginal housing gained more prominence in the first half of the decade. In 2003, the federal-provincial affordable housing program began, with $1 billion in federal expenditure to improve affordable housing supply by an estimated 23,500 units.

In 2005, CMHC introduced a 10 per cent "green refund" on mortgage loan insurance premiums for homeowners who buy or build an energy-efficient home, or who make energy-saving renovations to their existing homes.

CMHC also introduced two on-reserve loan insurance products during the first half of the decade, enabling Band Councils or Aboriginal persons to access CMHC-insured financing for the construction, purchase or renovation of single-family homes or multiple residential properties, and an insurance pilot designed to increase market housing on-reserve.

Mortgage loan insurance
CMHC's mortgage loan insurance products facilitate access to a range of housing options for Canadians and promote and contribute to the stability of the financial system. CMHC's commercial operations contribute to improving the Government of Canada's fiscal position through its net income and income taxes paid.

Mortgage loan insurance is mandatory for federally regulated lenders in Canada when the buyer of a home has less than a 20 per cent down payment. This insurance protects the mortgage lender against loss if a borrower defaults, and allows qualified borrowers to access homeownership at interest rates comparable to those offered to buyers with larger down payments.

As a public mortgage insurer, CMHC has a mandate to provide service in all parts of the country and for a range of housing forms. A significant portion of CMHC's mortgage loan insurance business is in markets or for housing options that are not served or less served by private mortgage insurers. In addition to being the primary insurer for housing in small and rural communities, CMHC is the only insurer of mortgages for multi-unit residential properties, including large rental buildings, student housing and nursing and retirement homes.

COVID-19 Response 
At the beginning of the 2020 COVID-19 pandemic, then CMHC CEO Evan Siddall warned home buyers their support for homeownership “can’t be unlimited.” They followed one month later by tightening mortgage insurance qualifications. The minimum qualifying credit score was increased from 600 to 680, the gross debt service ratio was capped at 35% from 39%, and total debt service ratio was capped at 42% from the previous 44%. The move was highly criticized, with the CEO claiming “vested interests are strongest before they fall.

The CMHC only has the power to regulate its own borrowers, and not competing private mortgage insurers. The result of the increased qualifying criteria  lead competition to acquire larger shares of the market. Sagen (formerly Genworth) subsequently replaced the CMHC as Canada’s largest mortgage default insurer.

In July 2021, the CMHC reversed the decision to tighten the lending criteria for mortgage insurance. The new CEO said it was a “mistake.”

Affordable housing
CMHC, on behalf of the Government of Canada, invests approximately $2 billion annually to help reduce the number of Canadians in housing need. This includes significant funding for social housing. Ongoing subsidies are provided under 25- to 50-year operating agreements with housing groups who provide affordable housing to those in need. Approximately 80 per cent of the existing social housing portfolio is administered by provinces and territories under long-term agreements with CMHC. The remaining 20 per cent is administered by CMHC and includes the on-reserve portfolio and certain federally funded housing units off-reserve, such as housing cooperatives.

Also as part of the $2 billion annual investment, CMHC provides funding to provinces and territories under the Investment in Affordable Housing (IAH).

CMHC also supports affordable housing through low-cost loans to federally assisted social housing sponsors seeking to finance new projects on-reserve or to renew existing financing.

CMHC's Affordable Housing Centre works with the private, public and non-profit sectors to help develop affordable housing that does not require ongoing federal assistance.

First-time home buyer incentive program

In the 2019 federal budget, the Canadian government introduced the first-time home buyer incentive program (or FTHBI). The program, run via the Canada Mortgage and Housing Corporation, is a form of equity sharing intended to help first time buyers with their down payments. The FTHBI allows eligible first-time home buyers to have 5% to 10% of their home down payment subsidized by the government as shared equity. Note that the program is unaffiliated with the Home Buyer Plan which allows buyers withdraw from their RRSP to increase their down payment. The program launched on September 2, 2019, but only covers purchases closing after November 1, 2019. The buyers must repay the government aid over a period of 15 years.

FTHBI Eligibility:
This program can only be used for down payments below 15% (LTV > 85%). Eligible buyers must have a gross household income not exceeding $120,000. These, along with various other restrictions, limit the effective maximum price of an FTHBI-eligible property to $565,000.  This is far below the median property prices in population centers such as Toronto and Vancouver, leading to concerns regarding the efficacy of the program in these areas. During the federal election campaign of 2019, the Liberal Party of Canada promised to expand this program to better help buyers in Toronto and Vancouver.

Under the FTHBI, a "first time home buyer" is anyone meeting the following criteria:
 Either Canadian or permanent resident of Canada
 At least 18 years old
 The property should be used a principle residence within 9 months after the purchase of the property
 Not owning any property anywhere in the world
 The spouse or common-law partner of the buyer should not have owned a home during the period he/she was in the relationship with the buyer.

First Nations housing
Through CMHC the Government of Canada provides funding each year to address housing needs in First Nation communities. CMHC's funding supports the construction of new rental housing, the renovation of existing homes, ongoing subsidies for existing rental social housing and an investment in capacity building for First Nations people living on-reserve.

CMHC's On-Reserve Non-Profit Housing Program assists First Nations in the construction, purchase and rehabilitation, and administration of suitable, adequate and affordable rental housing in First Nations communities. CMHC provides a subsidy to the project to assist with its financing and operation.

Policy and research
CMHC facilitates the development and implementation of federal housing policy to help Canadians meet their housing needs. This includes the examination of housing finance trends and policy options for regulations, incentives and securitization tools in the primary and secondary markets; the analysis of distinct housing needs of specific populations such as Aboriginal people, seniors, persons with disabilities, and low-income households, and how these needs can be addressed; and the identification of practical approaches to advancing sustainable technologies and practices in the housing sector.

CMHC provides regular housing market analyses and forecasts at the local, provincial and national levels. These activities support informed business decisions, policy development at all levels of government, and housing program design and delivery.

The CMHC is also a member of the International Union For Housing Finance, and participates in global research and policy development for housing finance. The CMHC is also the host of the Housing Finance Symposium, an academic event to discuss global housing finance issues.

Securitization
The CMHC engages in securitization of residential mortgages, under the provisions of the National Housing Act. This assists registered banks to be more liberal with lending policies, making it easier for residential buyers to obtain mortgages.

CMHC's securitization guarantee programs enable approved financial institutions to pool eligible mortgages and transform them into marketable securities that can be sold to investors. This generates funds for financial institutions that can be loaned to residential homeowners.

Securities sold to investors are Canada Mortgage Bonds issued by the Canada Housing Trust and National Housing Act Mortgage-Backed Securities issued by financial institutions. The timely payment of interest and principal on these securities is fully guaranteed by the Government of Canada, through CMHC.

There are nearly $500 billion worth of CMHC mortgage securities in-force.

CMHC also administers the legal framework for Canadian covered bonds on behalf of the Government of Canada. Introduced in 2012, the framework supports financial stability by helping lenders to further diversify their sources of funding and by attracting more international investors, thus making the market for covered bonds more robust.

The full government guarantee extended to publicly securitized mortgage debt, and the low cost to lenders, means that there has been healthy demand for the CMHC's securitization products. Today, the Crown corporation enjoys a monopoly in the securitization of mortgage debt, and there is no viable private securitization market for mortgages in Canada. While many experts champion this government monopoly in Canadian mortgage securitization, citing the high prudential regulation and stringent public oversight, this model nevertheless means that the majority of securitized mortgage debt is registered on the federal government's balance sheet. In a May 2019 speech to the Canadian Credit Union Association in Winnipeg, Bank of Canada Governor, Stephen Poloz, revealed his support for the development of a private mortgage securities market in Canada that would compete with the public securitization programs of the CMHC.

Recent developments
As part of Budget 2016, the Government announced several initiatives that CMHC will be delivering:

 Affordable Housing – A total of $1.4B over two years starting in 2016 broken down as follows:  $504.4 million related to measures to support the construction of new affordable housing units, the renovation and repair of existing affordable housing, measures to support housing affordability such as rent supplements and measures to foster safe and independent living which are expected to benefit more than 100,000 Canadian households;
 $200.7 million to support the construction, repair and adaption of affordable housing for seniors which is expected to improve housing conditions for more than 5,000 low-income households;
 $89.9 million for the construction and renovation of over 3,000 shelter spaces for victims of family violence;
 $573.9 million for retrofits and renovations to existing homes provided under our Social Housing Activity to address the increasing demand for repairs, as well as improve efficiency and reduce energy use, lowering utility costs and making housing more affordable; and
 $30 million to help federally administered providers maintain rent-geared-to-income for low-income households living in social housing.
 Up to $500 million per year for five years to provide low cost loans to municipalities and housing developers for the construction of new affordable housing projects. This initiative would encourage the construction of affordable rental housing by making low-cost capital available to developers during the earliest, most risky phases of development.
 $208.3 million over five years to be invested in an Affordable Rental Housing Innovation Fund that would be used to test innovative business approaches – such as housing models with a mix of rental income and home ownership.
 Northern & Inuit Housing – $177.7 million over two years starting in 2016 to address urgent housing needs in the North and Inuit communities.
 On-Reserve – $137.7 million over two years starting in 2016 most of which would support the renovation and retrofit of existing housing and $10.4 million over three years starting in 2016 to support the renovation and construction of new shelters for victims of family violence in First Nations communities.
 Up to $30 million over three years, starting in 2016–2017, to help homeowners dealing with costly structural problems in their homes as a result of the presence of the mineral pyrrhotite in their foundations.
 $5 million for 2016–2017 to support internships for up to 625 Indigenous youth. The additional funding for CMHC's Housing Internship Initiative for First Nations and Inuit Youth (HIIFNIY) comes from the $165.4 million investment to expand opportunities for young Canadians under the Youth Employment Strategy announced in Budget 2016.

In the 2019 federal budget, the federal government announced the First-Time Homebuyers Incentive (FTHBI) program to help first-time homebuyers realize the goal of homeownership. The program functions as a shared equity scheme in which the CMHC provides eligible participants with up to 5% of the purchase price of a resale home, and up to 10% of the purchase price of a newly constructed home. In return, the CMHC retains an equity stake in the property and recoups the value of the loan when the home is sold, or after a 25-year term. With this equity stake the CMHC shares in any gains or losses to the value of the property, proportionate to its 5% or 10% equity stake. The program was initially introduced over a limited four-year term and was allocated $1.25 billion. However, the governing Liberal party has committed to expanding the program further and removing certain pricing caps to make the potential pool of Canadians eligible for the program significantly larger.

In 2020, Canada Mortgage and Housing Corporation announced it would be rebranding to better reflect its changing mandate. One name under consideration is Housing Canada.

See also
 Granville Island – managed by CMHC
 Rainwater harvesting in Canada

References

Further reading
 

1946 establishments in Canada
Federal departments and agencies of Canada
Canadian federal Crown corporations
Companies based in Ottawa
Government agencies established in 1946
Mortgage lenders of Canada
Housing ministries